Richard D. Hayden  (May 7, 1928 – August 4, 2017) served as a Republican in the California State Assembly for the 22nd district. During World War II he served in the United States Army. He was born in Niles, Michigan  and died in Sunnyvale, California.

References

2017 deaths
United States Army personnel of World War II
1928 births
People from Niles, Michigan
Republican Party members of the California State Assembly